Anabel Ortiz Morales (born 5 July 1986) is a Mexican professional boxer. She is a two-time mini flyweight world champion, having held the WBA title since 2013 and previously the WBC title from 2009 to 2011. She also challenged once for the unified WBA, and WBO light flyweight titles in 2012. As of May 2020, she is ranked as the world's fifth best active female minimumweight by BoxRec.

Professional boxing career
Ortiz won the WBC female mini flyweight title in November 2009 with a unanimous decision (96–94, 96–94, 97–93) defeat of Caroline Moreno and defended it against Nanako Kikuchi in September 2010 before losing the title to Naoko Fujioka in May 2011. Ortiz was knocked down twice by Fujioka during the match, and lost by TKO. She fought Yésica Bopp for the WBA and WBO light flyweight titles in May 2012, but was unsuccessful.

A split decision victory over Etsuko Tada in July 2013 saw Ortiz gain the WBA female mini flyweight title. She retained the title in matches against Hye Soo Park in November 2013, Neisi Torres in July 2014, and Tada in November 2014. 2015 saw Ortiz keep hold of the title against Nana Yoshikawa in April (unanimous decision) and again against Sandra Robles in September (six round technical decision). She also beat Suri Tapia in November.

Ortiz continued her winning streak into 2016 with further successful defences against Katia Gutiérrez in April, Jolene Blackshear in June and Debora Rengifo in October. She remained undefeated into 2020, seeing off title challenges from Nancy Franco in 2017, from Yenifer Leon in 2018, and Maria Milano in 2019. All of her wins from 2016 to 2019 were by unanimous decision except against Blackshear, which was a win by TKO. A non-title defeat of Brenda Ramos in January 2020 was Ortiz's 14th consecutive victory, and bought her record to 24–3 including four knockouts.

Her boxing nickname is Avispa. She has two daughters.

References

External links
 

1986 births
Living people
Mexican women boxers
Mini-flyweight boxers
Boxers from Nayarit
Sportspeople from Tepic, Nayarit